Žar Mountain ( / Žar planina, Zar planina) is a mountain of Kosovo . It has an elevation of 1,511 metres above sea level.

The mountain marks the watershed of the drainage basins of the Ibar within the Danube drainage basin, the White Drin, and the Vardar. Hence the water from the mountain flows to the Black Sea, the Adriatic Sea and the Aegean Sea respectively.

Notes and references

Notes:

References:

Mountains of Serbia
Mountains of Kosovo